{{DISPLAYTITLE:C15H18O7}}
The molecular formula C15H18O7 (molar mass: 310.30 g/mol, exact mass: 310.1053 u) may refer to:

 Jiadifenolide
 Picrotin

Molecular formulas